Joseph L. Ross is a philatelist who has specialised in the revenue stamps of South America. Ross has also been a prolific philatelic author, compiling or updating a large number of revenue stamp catalogues and writing numerous articles in philatelic journals. His catalogue of Uruguay revenues, for instance, is the first since Forbin's world catalogue of 1915 and starts where that one finished.

In 2008, Ross won the Revenue Society Research Medal.

Selected publications

The revenue stamps of El Salvador. Elverta, California: Joe Ross, 1994. (Editor)
Panama telegraph stamps. 2000. (With Federico Brid)
The revenue stamps of Iraq. Joe Ross, third edition 2002. (With Avo Kaplanian and John Powell)
The revenue stamps of Qatar. 2003.
The revenue stamps of Jordan & the Occupied Territory (West Bank). 2004. (With Avo Kaplanian)
The revenue stamps of Uruguay Patente de Rodados de Departamento de Montevideo Vehicle Registration Department of Montevideo 1928-1963. Elverta, California: Joe Ross, 2005. 
Panama revenues, Papel Sellado 1821-1975. 2008.
Revenue stamps: The Republic of Uruguay 1915-2005. Elverta, California: Joe Ross, 2012. 
The revenue stamps of Liberia. Lydbrook, Glos: The Revenue Society, 2012. (With Clive Akerman and Bryant E. Korn)

References

External links
Revenues - Tracción a Sangre - Pulled by Blood by Joe Ross.

Living people
Year of birth missing (living people)
American philatelists
Revenue stamps